The Water Industry Act 1991 (c. 56) is an Act of the United Kingdom Parliament consolidating previous enactments relating to the water supply and the provision of wastewater services in England and Wales. It further implemented recommendations of the Law Commission.

Arrangement
The Act is divided into eight parts and a further 15 Schedules are attached

Sections
Part 1 deals with the appointment and duties of the Director General of Water Services. 
Part 2 deals with appointment and regulation of Undertakers, the private sector water companies responsible for maintaining the water supply system in the United Kingdom.
Part 3 deals with the duties of the water companies with respect to water supply in England and Wales, 
Part 4 deals with the duties of the water companies with respect to sewerage.
Part 5 deals with the financial provisions for operating the system
Part 6 gives the water companies certain powers in order to discharge their duties.
Part 7 deals with the provision of information to interested parties 
Part 8 deals with miscellaneous details such as limiting the right to prosecute water companies in respect of sewerage offences.

Schedules
Notable schedule within the act include 4 Customer Service Committees; 5 Pressure and Constancy of Supply; 6 Rights of Entry; 9 & 12 Compensation Provisions.

Part 2 Water Undertakers
As of 1 April 2005 the full list of undertakers was 
Scottish Water
Anglian Water Services Ltd
Northumbrian Water Ltd
Severn Trent Water Ltd
Southern Water Services Ltd
South West Water Ltd
Thames Water Utilities Ltd
United Utilities Water PLC [formerly North West Water Ltd]
Welsh Water - Dwr Cymru Cyfyngedig
Wessex Water Services Ltd
Yorkshire Water Services Ltd
Water only undertakers
Bournemouth and West Hampshire Water Plc 1 April 2005
Bristol Water plc 1 April 2005
Cambridge Water plc 1 April 2005
Cholderton and District Water Company Ltd 1 April 2005
Dee Valley Water plc 1 April 2005
Folkestone and Dover Water Services Ltd 1 April 2005
Mid Kent Water Ltd 26 August 2005
Portsmouth Water Ltd 1 April 2005
South East Water Ltd 1 April 2005
South Staffordshire Water plc 30 September 2005
Sutton and East Surrey Water plc 1 April 2005
Tendring Hundred Water Services Ltd 1 April 2005
Three Valleys Water Services plc

Part 3 Water Supply
Part 3 Imposes a duty to maintain an efficient and economical water supply system and proscribes minimum standards of performance in connection with water supply.

Standards of wholesomeness
Clause 67 of the act allows the Secretary of State to proscribe Standards of wholesomeness for water; prescribing the purposes for which the water is to be suitable; substances that are to be present or absent and the concentrations.

References

Water Industry Act 1991 (c. 56); HMSO

External links
 Water Industry Act 1991, as amended

 
 
United Kingdom Acts of Parliament 1991
Water supply and sanitation in England and Wales